Colby Everette Jones (born May 28, 2002) is an American college basketball player for the Xavier Musketeers of the Big East Conference.

High school career
Jones played basketball for Pinson Valley High School in Pinson, Alabama. As a sophomore, he averaged 23.9 points, 7.9 rebounds and 3.9 assists per game. After a coaching change at Pinson, he transferred to Mountain Brook High School in Mountain Brook, Alabama for his junior season to play under coach Bucky McMillan. Jones averaged 14 points, five rebounds and three assists per game as a junior. He played alongside Trendon Watford and helped the school win its third straight Class 7A state title. In his senior season, Jones assumed a leading role and averaged 25.2 points, 7.8 rebounds, 3.2 assists and 2.5 steals per game, helping Mountain Brook to a Class 7A runner-up finish. He was named Over the Mountain Journal Player of the Year, All-South Metro Player of the Year and Alabama Class 7A Player of the Year. A four-star recruit, he committed to play college basketball for Xavier over offers from Alabama, Auburn, Georgia and UAB.

College career
Jones missed the first five games of his freshman season at Xavier due to COVID-19 contact tracing. On January 10, 2021, he made a game-winning three-pointer in the final second of a 74–73 win against Providence. On February 16, he scored a season-high 20 points and had six rebounds in a 93–84 loss to St. John's. As a freshman, Jones averaged 7.7 points, 4.8 rebounds and 2.9 assists per game, and was selected to the Big East All-Freshman Team.

Career statistics

College

|-
| style="text-align:left;"| 2020–21
| style="text-align:left;"| Xavier
| 15 || 11 || 27.8 || .464 || .333 || .757 || 4.8 || 2.9 || 1.3 || .3 || 7.7

Personal life
Jones' father, Chad, played college basketball for UAB. His older brother, C. J., played basketball for Arkansas and Middle Tennessee in college before embarking on a professional career.

References

External links
Xavier Musketeers bio

2002 births
Living people
American men's basketball players
Basketball players from Birmingham, Alabama
Xavier Musketeers men's basketball players
Shooting guards